Florence Mkhize is an environmental protection vessel operated by the South African Ministry of the Environment.
She was launched in June 2006.

At the launch of Florence Mkhize, Marthinus van Schalkwyk, South African Ministry of the Environment, asserted the vessel's design was unique.

The hull is constructed of aluminium and she was designed and tested by Cape Advanced Engineering, a South African company based in Atlantis, Western Cape.
Florence Mkhize spent her first four months in commission countering perlemoen poaching in Algoa Bay near Port Elizabeth.

All of the South African environmental patrol vessels are named after anti-apartheid heroines, like Florence Mkhize.

References

Patrol vessels of South Africa
2006 ships